Afrophobia, Afroscepticism, or Anti-African sentiment is a perceived or actual prejudice, hostility, discrimination, or racism towards people and cultures of Africa and the African diaspora.

Prejudice against Africans and people of African descent has a long history, dating back to the Atlantic slave trade. In the United States, it was manifested in the form of Jim Crow laws and segregated housing, schools, and public facilities. In South Africa, it was manifested in the form of the apartheid system.

In recent years, there has been a rise in Afrophobic hate speech and violence in Europe and the United States. This has been attributed to a number of factors, including the growth of the African diaspora in these regions, the increase in refugees and migrants from Africa, and the rise of far-right and populist political parties.

In October 2017, the United Nations General Assembly held a high-level meeting on combating Afrophobia, with a view to adopting a resolution to address the issue.

Lexicology
Primarily a cultural phenomenon, Afrophobia pertains to the various traditions and peoples of Africa, irrespective of racial origin. As such, Afrophobia is distinct from the historical racial phenomenon of negrophobia, which is specifically based on contempt for negro peoples. The opposite of Afrophobia is Afrophilia, which is a love for all things pertaining to Africa.

By location 
It has been observed that writing and terminology about racism, including about Afrophobia, has been somewhat centered on the US. In 2016, "Afrophobia" has been used as a term for racism against darker-skinned persons in China. In such usage, that is an inexact term because the racism is directed against darker-skinned persons from anywhere, without regard to any connection to Africa. Conversely, Chinese views for lighter-than-average skin are more positive, as is reflected in advertising.

Terminology 
The terms "Afrophobia" and "Afroscepticism" are similar to Europhobia and Euroscepticism and can refer to three different ideas:

 Afrophobia, or Anti-African sentiment, is a perceived fear and hatred of the cultures and peoples of Africa, as well as the African diaspora, which is also a social struggle about who has the right to be cared for by the state and society and a fight for the collective balance of rights and economic resource allocation by the modern state. 
 Hard Afroscepticism is a principled opposition to African integration and therefore can be seen in groups that think that their countries should not be part of it or whose policies towards the integration are tantamount to being opposed to the whole project of African integration, as it is currently conceived and/or projected to be.
 Soft Afroscepticism does not have a principled objection to African integration but has concerns on one or a number of policy areas, which lead to the expression of qualified and justified opposition to the integration, or there is a sense that national rights and interests are currently at odds with the integration's trajectory.

Activism
To overcome any perceived "Afrophobia", writer Langston Hughes suggested that European Americans must achieve peace of mind and accommodate the uninhibited emotionality of African Americans. Author James Baldwin similarly recommended that White Americans could quash any "Afrophobia" on their part by getting in touch with their repressed feelings, empathizing to overcome their "emotionally stunted" lives, and thereby overcome any dislike or fear of African Americans.

In 2016, Tess Asplund made a viral protest against Neo-Nazism as part of her activism against Afrophobia.

In academia
Some Afrophobic sentiments are based on the belief that Africans are unsophisticated. Such perceptions include the belief that Africans lack a history of civilization, and visual imagery of such stereotypes perpetuate the notion that Africans still live in mud huts and carry spears, along with other notions that indicate their primitiveness.

Afrophobia in academia may also occur through by oversight with regards to lacking deconstruction in mediums such as African art forms, omitting historical African polities in world cartography, or promoting a eurocentric viewpoint by ignoring historic African contributions to world civilization.

See also
Afrophilia
Aporophobia
Nativism (politics)
Xenophobia
Ethnocentrism
Discrimination based on skin color
Racial discrimination
Racial segregation
Apartheid
Black Codes (United States)
Jim Crow laws
White Australia policy
White nationalism
White supremacy
Negro
Nigger
Antiziganism
Anti-Mexican sentiment
Hispanophobia
Racial antisemitism
Nazi racial theories
Racial policy of Nazi Germany
Anti-Europeanism
Anti-Western sentiment
Antisemitism
Racism
Racism against Black Americans
 Racism in the United States
 List of ethnic slurs
 List of phobias
 List of religious slurs

References

Xenophobia
African society
Foreign relations of Africa